Concord Mall may refer to:

Concord Mall (Delaware), a shopping mall in Wilmington, Delaware
Concord Mall (Indiana), a shopping mall in Elkhart, Indiana
Concord Mills, a shopping mall in Concord, North Carolina

See also
Concord (disambiguation)